Jung Ji-hyun (born March 26, 1983 in Seoul) is a South Korean wrestler who won a gold medal at the 2004 Olympics.

References

External links
 profile

1983 births
Living people
South Korean male sport wrestlers
Olympic wrestlers of South Korea
Wrestlers at the 2004 Summer Olympics
Wrestlers at the 2008 Summer Olympics
Wrestlers at the 2012 Summer Olympics
Olympic gold medalists for South Korea
Olympic medalists in wrestling
Asian Games medalists in wrestling
Wrestlers at the 2002 Asian Games
Wrestlers at the 2010 Asian Games
Wrestlers at the 2014 Asian Games
World Wrestling Championships medalists
Medalists at the 2004 Summer Olympics
Asian Games gold medalists for South Korea
Asian Games silver medalists for South Korea
Medalists at the 2010 Asian Games
Medalists at the 2014 Asian Games
Universiade medalists in wrestling
Universiade silver medalists for South Korea
20th-century South Korean people
21st-century South Korean people